Sistak may refer to:
 Sistak-e Olya